Bank of Bahawalpur was the central bank of the State of Bahawalpur. The bank became a subsidiary of the National Bank of Pakistan after the dissolution of the state in 1955.

References

Bahawalpur (princely state)
Banks disestablished in 1955
Tourist attractions in Bahawalpur
Central banks
Defunct banks of Pakistan
State Bank of Pakistan
1955 disestablishments in Pakistan
Banks with year of establishment missing